Te Awanga is a small rural beachside town in Hawke's Bay, New Zealand. Te Awanga is near Cape Kidnappers, which has a renowned colony of the Australasian gannet.

Te Awanga town is just smaller than Haumoana, which is further along the beach towards Napier. The town was developed as a holiday settlement. There are shops, cafes and wineries located nearby to the town. Activities which are common at Te Awanga include fishing, swimming, surfing and boating. Surfing is popular when large easterly swells move into Hawke Bay. The 18 hole world-famous Cape Kidnappers Golf Course is located near Te Awanga.

Te Awanga is located at 39°S 177°E on Hawke Bay on the east coast of New Zealand. The town is located sixteen kilometres south of the centre of Napier and twelve kilometres east of the centre of Hastings. It is ten kilometres west of Cape Kidnappers. The road towards Cape Kidnappers, Clifton Road, passes through Te Awanga on its way to Clifton. The Maraetotara River mouth is at Te Awanga.

Te Awanga is located in an area which can be prone to coastal erosion. The Te Awanga shoreline can be eroded by stormy seas and high tides. The long term shoreline retreat is due to erosion caused by the sea at Te Awanga is on average between 0.30m and 0.70m per year. However, this rate was challenged and debunked in court circa 1988.

Demographics
It is part of the wider Haumoana-Te Awanga statistical area.

Te Awanga had a population of 768 at the 2018 New Zealand census, an increase of 39 people (5.3%) since the 2013 census, and an increase of 42 people (5.8%) since the 2006 census. There were 303 households, comprising 387 males and 381 females, giving a sex ratio of 1.02 males per female, with 126 people (16.4%) aged under 15 years, 105 (13.7%) aged 15 to 29, 393 (51.2%) aged 30 to 64, and 150 (19.5%) aged 65 or older.

Ethnicities were 90.6% European/Pākehā, 16.4% Māori, 2.0% Pacific peoples, 2.0% Asian, and 3.5% other ethnicities. People may identify with more than one ethnicity.

Although some people chose not to answer the census's question about religious affiliation, 56.2% had no religion, 31.6% were Christian, 1.6% had Māori religious beliefs, 0.4% were Hindu, 0.4% were Muslim, 0.8% were Buddhist and 3.1% had other religions.

Of those at least 15 years old, 165 (25.7%) people had a bachelor's or higher degree, and 93 (14.5%) people had no formal qualifications. 108 people (16.8%) earned over $70,000 compared to 17.2% nationally. The employment status of those at least 15 was that 333 (51.9%) people were employed full-time, 111 (17.3%) were part-time, and 12 (1.9%) were unemployed.

References

External links
 Hawke's Bay Tourism

Hastings District
Beaches of the Hawke's Bay Region
Populated places in the Hawke's Bay Region
Populated places around Hawke Bay